St Paul's is a Grade II* listed Anglican church at Queen Caroline Street, Hammersmith, London W6, adjacent to Hammersmith flyover, and only a short walk from Hammersmith tube station.

History

The original church
The church dates back to the 17th century. The 2nd Earl of Mulgrave purchased the land in 1629, and the main contributor to the building fund (£700) was the wealthy merchant Sir Nicholas Crispe, who had lived since 1625 in a house on the riverside in Hammersmith. The foundation stone was laid on 11 March 1630, and the chapel of ease was consecrated by Archbishop Laud on 7 June 1631.

The present church
Hammersmith was developing rapidly, helped by the arrival of the new Metropolitan Railway. At a public meeting held on 20 January 1880, the decision was taken to rebuild the church on the same site. It was felt that the building was no longer big enough to accommodate the growing population and 'The old unsightly structure is not worthy of being the chief witness to God in the midst of such an important Metropolitan Suburb as Hammersmith has now become.' In July 1882 the Duke of Albany laid the foundation stone, and the nave of the new church was consecrated on 13 October 1883. The architects were J. P. Seddon and H. R. Gough.

Like St Peter's Church in Hammersmith, St Paul's lost a significant portion of its land, including that with graves, when Hammersmith Flyover and the Great West Road were built in 1957–61.

Hammersmith Chess Club briefly used the Church Hall as their home venue from 1970 to 1975, before later moving on to Blythe House.

In 1983, the church pews were removed and replaced with more flexible seating.

In the 2000s, an extension was built onto the western end of the church, incorporating a new hall and kitchen, and accompanied by a major restoration programme. The work was done by Bryen & Langley and the extension was opened in 2011.

The church has strong ties with the nearby Latymer Upper School, which gathers at the church on its Founder's Day each year.

Exterior
The church is designed in the Early English Gothic Style, with lancet windows, powerful buttresses, a high roof and an imposing tower.

Interior

The internal dimensions of St Paul's Church are: length 190 ft (57.9m), width 73 ft (22.25 m), height 63 ft (19.2m). It was designed to seat 1,400 people. The walls are of brown Ancaster stone, with Belgian marble used for the clustered columns and wall-linings. There are six bays, formed by the five main columns on each side, with white and blue Bath stone used for the arches and some carved decoration.

The most interesting feature inside the church is a bust of King Charles I, sculpted by Hubert Le Sueur and erected by Sir Nicholas Crispe. After the King's execution in 1649, the heart of Crispe, enclosed in a small urn, was placed below this monument. The inscription on the urn reads:

In 1898 his body and heart were both moved to a new tomb.

The pulpit came from the former church of All-Hallows-the-Great in the City of London.

There is also a memorial to William Tierney Clark, designer of the first Hammersmith Bridge, in the church.

The stained glass windows of the church were made by Clayton and Bell. Those on the north side depict the life of Saint Paul, the apostle of the Church; while those on the south side depict the life of Saint Peter, the other apostle who is usually paired with Paul.

Burials

Sir Nicholas Crispe, merchant
 Samuel Morland, inventor
 Richard Honey, carpenter, and George Francis, bricklayer, both killed by troops during the funeral procession of Queen Caroline of Brunswick in 1821.

See also
HTB network

References

External links
 Official website

Hammersmith
Churches completed in 1631
Rebuilt churches in the United Kingdom
Churches completed in 1891
19th-century Church of England church buildings
Grade II* listed buildings in the London Borough of Hammersmith and Fulham
Grade II* listed churches in London
Grade II* listed government buildings
Diocese of London
Hammersmith
History of the London Borough of Hammersmith and Fulham
1631 establishments in England
Holy Trinity Brompton plants